The Hon. Charles Hugh Lindsay  (11 November 1816 – 25 March 1889) was a British soldier, courtier and Conservative politician.

Background

Lindsay was born at Muncaster Castle, the third son of James Lindsay, 24th Earl of Crawford, and the Hon. Maria, daughter of John Pennington, 1st Baron Muncaster. The Hon. Sir James Lindsay was his elder brother.

Public life
Lindsay sat as Member of Parliament for Abingdon between 1865 and 1874. He was also a Lieutenant-Colonel in the Grenadier Guards and Colonel in the St George's Rifle Regiment and served as a Groom-in-Waiting to Queen Victoria.

Family
Lindsay married Emilia Anne, daughter of the Very Reverend the Hon. Henry Montague Browne, Dean of Lismore, in 1851. His daughter Violet Lindsay was an artist. She married Henry Manners, 8th Duke of Rutland and was the mother of Lady Diana Cooper. Emilia Anne died in February 1873. Lindsay survived her by 16 years and died in March 1889, aged 72.

References

External links 

1816 births
1889 deaths
Younger sons of earls
Charles
Companions of the Order of the Bath
Conservative Party (UK) MPs for English constituencies
Members of the Parliament of the United Kingdom for Abingdon
UK MPs 1865–1868
UK MPs 1868–1874